Events in the year 1911 in Portugal.

Incumbents
President: Teófilo Braga (President of the Provisional Government) (until 24 August), Manuel de Arriaga (from 24 August)
Prime Minister: Teófilo Braga (until 3 September), João Pinheiro Chagas (from 3 September to 12 November), Augusto de Vasconcelos (from 12 November)

Events
Establishment of the University of Lisbon
22 March - Establishment of the University of Porto
22 May - Introduction of the Portuguese escudo
28 May - Constituent National Assembly election

Arts and entertainment
Establishment of the Chiado Museum

Sport
Establishment of CU Micaelense
Establishment of Lusitano G.C.
Establishment of Porto–Lisboa
Establishment of the Taça José Monteiro da Costa
11 April - Establishment of F.C. Barreirense
15 September - Establishment of Académico F.C.
8 December - Establishment of S.C. Salgueiros

References

 
Portugal
Years of the 20th century in Portugal
Portugal